Two ships of the Royal Navy have borne the name HMS Mounsey, after Captain William Mounsey:

  was an  launched in 1915 and sold in 1921.
  was a  launched in 1943 and returned to the US Navy in 1946.

Royal Navy ship names